House of Mortal Sin (also known as The Confessional and The Confessional Murders) is a 1976 British psychological horror slasher film directed and produced by Pete Walker. It was scripted by David McGillivray from a story by Walker. Its plot concerns a deranged priest who takes it upon himself to punish his parishioners for their moral transgressions.

Plot
Hearing that her friend Bernard has become a Catholic priest, Jenny attends church to seek him out but finds that the man taking confession is not Bernard, but the elderly Father Meldrum. She quickly leaves, but not before telling Meldrum that her on-off boyfriend Terry recently pressured her into having an abortion. Outwardly a kind-hearted counsellor of troubled youth, Meldrum is in fact a fervent believer in "divine justice" who freely resorts to emotional abuse in his obsessive efforts to redeem those he views as sinners. That night, while Jenny is out, Meldrum gains entry to her flat and assaults her friend Robert, believing him to be Terry. The unconscious Robert is taken to hospital.

The next day, Meldrum invites Jenny over to his presbytery, which he shares with his frail, bed-bound mother and his housekeeper, Miss Brabazon. During the meeting, Jenny is shocked to discover that Meldrum taped her confession to blackmail her. When she tells Terry of Meldrum's actions, Terry tracks Meldrum down and threatens him, but Meldrum bludgeons Terry to death with an incense burner and buries him in a freshly dug grave in the churchyard. Later, he quietly murders Robert in hospital.

At first refusing to believe Jenny's claims about Meldrum, Jenny's sister Vanessa learns the truth when she answers a threatening phone call from the priest on Jenny's behalf. She goes to the presbytery and encounters Mrs Meldrum, who knows that her son is mad and begs Vanessa to help. Meldrum arrives, strangles Vanessa, and at Brabazon's urging, murders his mother on the pretext of a mercy killing. Brabazon consoles Meldrum and says that she has always loved him, even though his mother forced him to call off their wedding and embrace a life of celibacy by entering the church. The pair make a suicide pact so that they can be together for ever, but after Brabazon fatally stabs herself, Meldrum hesitates. Bernard discovers the bodies of Terry and Vanessa and confronts Meldrum, who claims that Brabazon committed the murders out of love for him. He persuades Bernard to help him cover up the crimes for the good of the church. After Bernard leaves, Meldrum silent-calls Jenny to check that she is at home, then puts on a cloak and steps out into the night.

Cast

Anthony Sharp as Father Xavier Meldrum
Susan Penhaligon as Jenny Welch
Stephanie Beacham as Vanessa Welch
Norman Eshley	 as Father Bernard Cutler
Sheila Keith	 as Miss Brabazon
Mervyn Johns	 as Father Duggan
Hilda Barry	 as Mrs Meldrum
Stewart Bevan	 as Terry Wyatt (as Stuart Bevan)
Julia McCarthy	 as Mrs Davey
Jon Yule	 as Robert
Bill Kerr	  as Mr Davey
Victor Winding	 as Dr Gaudio
Jack Allen	 as GP
Kim Butcher	 as Valerie Davey
Ivor Salter	 as Gravedigger
Andrew Sachs	 as Man in Church
Jane Hayward	 as Nurse

Production

Filming
The film was shot on location in Berkshire, England.

Music
The music was composed and conducted by Stanley Myers.

Release

Critical response

"McGillivray’s script is full of inventive ideas which were obviously meant to shock and stir up controversy. Having the villainous murderer a repressed and crazed Catholic priest in modern times brought a new and different kind of monster to the catalog of British horror, and he’s marvelously played by Anthony Sharp. A lapsed Catholic in real life, Walker uses the film as a comment on organized religion, as extreme and satirical as it may be…” ~ George R. Reis, DVD Drive-In 
 "Much criticism has been leveled against this film for its unabashed attacks on Catholicism, but it's really Walker's trademark amoral approach to filmmaking that elicits a strong urge to take a hot bath after viewing." ~ Cavett Binion, Allmovie 
"a disappointment, although it has its moments...The script relies too much on mild sacrilege for its effects, instead of concentrating on more interesting aspects of religious repression." ~ Time Out 
"I ended up being quite impressed with this one; it's one of those horror movies that tries to be about something more than just scaring people." ~ Dave Sindelar, Fantastic Movie Musings & Ramblings
"the way the creepier, suffocating aspects of religion are brought out is bold and effective. As a whole, it's a callous, low budget and grey-toned work, but stays with the viewer longer than slicker horrors then or since." ~ Graeme Clark, The Spinning Image 
"well-executed and maintains a dark interest throughout, supported by interesting performances (especially Sheila Keith as Meldrum's devoted love)." ~ The Terror Trap
"Walker fails to bring any sensibility, other than the merely exploitative, to the grotesque material, this must be considered pretty irredeemable stuff, even for a horror film." ~ TV Guide 
"there are more pros than con with "House of Mortal Sin," but Walker feels constipated with this effort, unsure if he wants to court controversy or make a cracking chiller." ~ Brian Orndorf, Blu-Ray.com 
"A hugely underrated shocker from cult director Pete Walker, who alone saved the British cinema of the 1970s from complete terror blandness with a series of Home County horrors that included House of Whipcord and Frightmare. Anthony Sharp gives an extraordinary performance...A serious look at the theme of a respectable public person using their position to pass judgement on those they see as corrupt, done with elegance, wit and purposely indignant bad taste." ~ Alan Jones, Radio Times

Home media

References

External links

1976 films
1976 horror films
1976 independent films
British horror films
British independent films
Films about abuse
Films about Catholic priests
Films about murderers
Films directed by Pete Walker
Films scored by Stanley Myers
Matricide in fiction
1970s English-language films
1970s British films